Kentucky Route 70 (KY 70) is a long east-east state highway that originates at a junction with U.S. Route 60 (US 60) in Smithland in Livingston County, just east of the Ohio River. The route continues through the counties of Crittenden, Caldwell, Hopkins, Muhlenberg, Butler, Edmonson, Barren, Barren, Metcalfe, Green, Taylor, Casey, Pulaski, Lincoln and back into Pulaski again to terminate at a junction with US 150 near Maretburg in Rockcastle.

Route description

Livingston County
Kentucky Route 70 begins in the Livingston County seat of Smithland, Kentucky, originating at a junction with U.S. Route 60 (US 60). It travels eastward to a junction with KY 866, and reaches a dead end at Tiline, along the Cumberland River. KY 70 does not connect from Tiline to Dycusburg since the ferry service at that point was discontinued in 1951.

Crittenden and Caldwell counties
KY 70 returns to life at Dycusburg, on the Crittenden County side of the river. KY 295 ends at that same point. KY 70 moves on to join U.S. Route 641 and Kentucky Route 91 in southern Crittenden County, and all three routes enters Caldwell County near the community of Fredonia. KY 70 and 91 departs from US 641, and then the two state routes split not too long after. Highway 91 goes southeast for Princeton, while KY 70 continues due east to go through mainly rural sections of northern Caldwell County, intersecting Kentucky Route 293 just northeast of Princeton.

Hopkins and Muhlenberg counties
KY 70 crosses the Tradewater River into Hopkins County. It intersects KY 109 at Beulah, and then reaches Madisonville, the Hopkins County seat. It gets co-signed with U.S. Route 41 in downtown Madisonville before breaking off and then traverses the Exit 114 interchange of Interstate 69 (I-69) (formerly Edward T. Breathitt Pennyrile Parkway exit 42) on the east side. It intersects KY 85 just east of town before KY 70 enters Muhlenberg County, while KY 85 provides access into McLean County.

After entering Muhlenberg County, KY 70 goes through mainly northern areas of that county, including intersections with Kentucky Routes 175, and 181, before reaching the Central City area, where it would join US 431 for a little while.

In Central City, US 431 and KY 70 both meet US 62, and then traverse the exit 58 interchange of the Wendell H. Ford Western Kentucky Parkway (also known as the WK Parkway). That interchange was a former toll booth site until the 1987 discontinuation of the WK Parkway's toll plazas.

Much of US 431's concurrency with KY 70 is designated as part of a Kentucky Scenic Byway.

KY 70 breaks off from US 431 at that point south of Drakesboro, and will provide a scenic drive from there, past the old site of the Rochester Dam before crossing the Mud River into Butler County. Until 2021, steam from the Tennessee Valley Authority's Paradise Coal-firing plant can be seen from the highway between Drakesboro and Rochester.

Butler County
In Butler County, Kentucky Route 70 intersects KY 369 while going through Rochester. It then intersects Kentucky Route 106 (KY 106/Huntsville-Quality Road) not too far southeast of there, and would then go on to the communities of South Hill and Dunbar.

Not too far east of Dunbar, KY 70 intersects KY 1468 and enters the city of Morgantown. The route intersects an interchange of I-165, the former William H. Natcher Parkway. That intersection opened during the 1999-2000 fiscal year. Between I-165 and US 231/KY 79, KY 70 is known as Veterans Way and runs concurrently with US 231 Truck and KY 79 Truck.

KY 70 runs concurrently with U.S. Route 231 and Kentucky Route 79 from Morgantown, over the Green River into the community of Aberdeen. In Aberdeen, KY 70 actually departs US 231 a little bit after KY 79 does. KY 70 then intersects KY 79 for a final time, continuing east from Aberdeen through Jetson, and then Roundhill, where it intersects Kentucky Route 185.

The Caveland area (Edmonson, Barren, and Metcalfe counties)

After the intersection with KY 185, KY 70 immediately enters Edmonson County. KY 70 then rolls onward towards the communities of Huff and Windyville. It then meets KY 259, and then KY 70 and 259 run concurrently to cross the Green River at Brownsville, the Edmonson County seat. This is KY 70's second crossing of the Green River. The two state routes run concurrently throughout the city of Brownsville, and splits just south of the Edmonson County High School on the south side of town.

Going east of Brownsville, KY 70 is the main route through Mammoth Cave National Park in Edmonson and Barren Counties. While traversing the park, KY 70 runs concurrently with the Mammoth Cave Parkway before entering Barren County. After a brief concurrency with KY 255, KY 70 traverses the exit 53 interchange of Interstate 65, and meeting the western terminus of KY 90 and then crosses US 31W, all three actions occur in Cave City, which is the core part of a tourism hotbed in Barren County because of the close proximity to the Mammoth Cave National Park.

Most of KY 70 from Brownsville to Cave City is designated as an official Kentucky Scenic Byway. KY 70 from the Mammoth Cave park's southeast boundary to the junction with KY 90 is part of the Cordell Hill Scenic Byway, most of which is the core route of the annual Roller Coaster Yard Sale, which includes parts of KY 90 and KY 63 in the southern part of the state.

After departing Cave City, KY 70 goes further east to cross U.S. Route 31E at Griderville, and heads for Hiseville, and then crosses into the northern part of Metcalfe County. After KY 70's Metcalfe County entrance, it goes through Sulphur Well, and then beyond that point, KY 70 joins US 68.

Green and Taylor counties
Both KY 70 and U.S. Route 68 begins a concurrency going through northern Metcalfe County before entering Green County and go through Exie, and Greensburg to cross the Green River (this is KY 70's third Green River crossing). After running a concurrency with a third route, KY 61, US 68/KY 70 continues east into Taylor County. In Campbellsville, KY 70's companionship with US 68 ends, and KY 70 goes back to being a standalone highway. KY 70 is replaced with KY 55 in terms of concurrency with US 68 for its course to Lebanon.
KY 70, alone, continues eastward through eastern Taylor County to Elk Horn and Mannsville.

Casey, Lincoln, Pulaski, and Rockcastle counties
Kentucky Route 70 reaches Casey County, where it reaches Liberty, cross the Green River for a fourth time, and intersect US 127. After that KY 70 crosses the Green River for a fifth and final time, and traverses mainly rural areas of Casey, and then Lincoln and Pulaski Counties. US 27 crosses KY 70 near Eubank, just north of Science Hill. KY 70 ends at its eastern terminus at a junction with US 150 near the Rockcastle County community of Broadhead, just west of Mount Vernon.

Points of interest
John Prine Memorial Park at Rochester Dam.
Charles Black City Park in Morgantown - home to the annual Green River Catfish Festival held in late June and early July.
Mammoth Cave National Park (Official Page)
Kentucky Action Park and Jesse James Riding Stables near Cave City is a major attraction in the region that identifies itself as a one-stop spot for family fun. The riding stable has won A Certificate of Excellence for 2012 by its guests, along with TripAdvisor.
Guntown Mountain is a realistic replica of an Old West town accessible via a scenic skylift.
Dinosaur World just 100 yards west of the I-65 Exit 53 interchange with KY 70.
Lighthouse Restaurant - a roadside diner in Sulphur Well offering southern style dishes.

History

Kentucky Route 70 was one of the many charter routes when the Kentucky State Highway system was first started in the 1920s and 1930s

The low underpass under railroad tracks near Eubank just west of the US 27 junction has been closed and bypassed with a highway overpass just north of old route. The new roadway is wider and has no restrictions.

Improvements were completed in Liberty in early 2013 to widen KY 70 from near Green River bridge, to Connector Road, as part of the Dry Ridge Hill reconstruction project. Future plans include major upgrades further east past High School with improvements ending near KY 501.

Reconstruction of KY 70 west of Liberty from KY 1547 to KY 206 area near Creston. Further plans would create a more direct route for KY 70 to connect Liberty to Campbellsville

KY 70 was and still is the main route through Mammoth Cave National Park in Barren and Edmonson counties.

Major intersections

Special routes

Kentucky Route 70 Bypass (Cave City)

Kentucky Route 70 Bypass was a supplemental bypass route in Cave City, Kentucky. The route encompasses the first  of KY 90 (Happy Valley Road), and US 31W from the KY 90 junction to the KY 70 junction in downtown Cave City. Although the route was known as KY 70 Bypass, by the mid 2000s, it was only signed as a trailblazer sign along the two specified routes.

Kentucky Route 70 Business (Liberty)

Kentucky Route 70 Business (KY 70 Bus.) is a business route of KY 70 in Liberty, Kentucky. It accounts with the old KY 70 alignment in downtown Liberty. It was formed after KY 70 was rerouted to a new junction with US 127]. The business route starts just west of Liberty, and it goes through downtown to end at the intersection with US 127 and the re-routed regular KY 70, which resumes after the intersection. The regular alignment of KY 70 was rerouted to a new intersection with US 127, then it gets co-joined with US 127 north to re-join the original route of KY 70 near downtown Liberty.

References

External links
 
 
 
 
 
 
 
 
 
 
 
 
 
 
 
KY 70 at Kentucky Roads

 
0070
0070
0070
0070
0070
0070
0070
0070
0070
0070
0070
0070
0070
0070
0070
0070
Mammoth Cave National Park